East Norriton Township is a township and a census-designated place in Montgomery County, Pennsylvania, United States. The population was 13,590 at the 2010 census. It is served by the Norristown Area School District.

History
On March 9, 1909, Norriton Township was divided into East Norriton Township and West Norriton Township.

The Barley Sheaf Inn and Old Norriton Presbyterian Church are listed on the National Register of Historic Places.

Geography
East Norriton Township is located at  (40.148744, -75.33291).

East Norriton was recognized by Business Week as one of the nation's top five Best Affordable Suburbs in 2009. The township is situated on the US 202 corridor, north of King of Prussia and Norristown. East Norriton has a little league program.

Government and politics

East Norriton Township is a second-class township that elects five supervisors at-large.
Ashley DiPiero, Chair
Joseph Gavanus, Vice-chair
Dennis DeSanto Jr.
Kevin McDevitt
Jamila Winder

Demographics

As of the 2010 census, the township was 82.0% White, 9.0% Black or African American, 0.1% Native American, 6.3% Asian, and 1.5% were two or more races. 3.2% of the population were of Hispanic or Latino ancestry.

As of the census of 2000, there were 13,211 people, 5,156 households, and 3,547 families residing in the township. The population density was 2,172.7 people per square mile (838.9/km2). There were 5,310 housing units at an average density of 873.3/sq mi (337.2/km2). The racial makeup of the township was 88.79% White, 6.06% African American, 0.13% Native American, 3.84% Asian, 0.39% from other races, and 0.80% from two or more races. Hispanic or Latino of any race were 1.17% of the population.

There were 5,156 households, out of which 24.7% had children under the age of 18 living with them, 58.4% were married couples living together, 7.2% had a female householder with no husband present, and 31.2% were non-families. 25.4% of all households were made up of individuals, and 11.2% had someone living alone who was 65 years of age or older. The average household size was 2.45 and the average family size was 2.97.

In the township the population was spread out, with 18.8% under the age of 18, 6.1% from 18 to 24, 29.2% from 25 to 44, 25.4% from 45 to 64, and 20.4% who were 65 years of age or older. The median age was 42 years. For every 100 females there were 90.8 males. For every 100 females age 18 and over, there were 88.1 males.

The median income for a household in the township was $60,536, and the median income for a family was $70,162. Males had a median income of $49,737 versus $33,642 for females. The per capita income for the township was $28,749. About 1.9% of families and 2.9% of the population were below the poverty line, including 2.1% of those under age 18 and 5.9% of those age 65 or over.

Transportation

U.S. Route 202 is the only numbered highway directly serving the township. It mostly follows Dekalb Pike along a northeast-southwest alignment across the southeastern portion of East Norriton. Southbound US 202 breaks off from Dekalb Pike to follow Johnson Highway along the border with Norristown for a short stretch before turning left into Norristown via Markley Street.

SEPTA provides Suburban Bus service to East Norriton Township along Route 90, which runs between the Norristown Transportation Center and the Plymouth Meeting Mall; Route 96, which runs between the Norristown Transportation Center and Lansdale; and Route 98, which runs between the Norristown Transportation Center and Blue Bell via the Plymouth Meeting Mall.

Economy
Einstein Medical Center, the major hospital for Montgomery County sits on 87 acres, the former land of Wood's Golf Center

Genuardi's, a division of Safeway Inc., formerly had  its headquarters in the township.

Education
The township is in the Norristown Area School District.

Holy Rosary Regional Catholic School in Plymouth Meeting and Plymouth Township is the area Catholic school. It was formed in 2012 by the merger of Our Lady of Victory in East Norriton, Epiphany of Our Lord School in Plymouth Meeting, and St. Titus in East Norriton.

See also 

 Norristown

References

External links

East Norriton Township

Census-designated places in Montgomery County, Pennsylvania
Townships in Montgomery County, Pennsylvania
Townships in Pennsylvania